John Joseph Fugelsang (born September 3, 1969) is an American actor, comedian, writer, television host, political commentator and television personality.

Early life and education
Fugelsang was born on Long Island, New York. Of Danish, German, and Irish descent, he is the son of a former Carmelite nun and a former Franciscan monk.

At New York University, Fugelsang attended the Tisch School of the Arts and graduated with a degree in Film and Television. Fugelsang also studied Theatre at the Circle in the Square Theatre.

Career

Stage and screen
Fugelsang has appeared in diverse projects as an actor, ranging from CSI and Providence to Coyote Ugly. As a comedian, he has performed at the US Comedy Arts Festival in Aspen and the Just for Laughs Festival in Montréal and made over 20 appearances on Politically Incorrect.

In 2007, he premiered the acclaimed solo show All The Wrong Reasons Off Broadway at New York Theatre Workshop. The show received a Drama League nomination for "Distinguished Performance". New York Magazine said "Fugelsang has the soul of an iconoclast" and The New York Daily News said the piece "packed an unexpectedly lovely and life affirming wallop."

Subsequent runs included Los Angeles, Seattle, New York City's Barrow Street Theatre, Albuquerque, and closing the South Beach Comedy Festival in Miami.

Additional film, television, and stage credits include Becker, Somewhere in the City, The Michael Richards Show, Beyond Belief, Chicken Soup for the Soul, Hamlet, Blue Window, and Savage in Limbo.

Fugelsang also appeared in the 2015 documentary film Dream On.

Host and presenter
Fugelsang has hosted George Harrison: The Last Performance and Paul McCartney's Live Town Hall on VH1. He was also on America's Funniest Home Videos (co-hosting with Daisy Fuentes) for two seasons (1998–99), co-hosted John McEnroe's short-lived CNBC talk show in 2004, and was a regular on CNBC's Bullseye and Fox News's Red Eye. He was the co-host of the World Series of Blackjack on GSN alongside Bringing Down the House author Ben Mezrich. He also co-hosted, along with Debra Wilson and Teresa Strasser, TV Watercooler on TV Guide Channel (2005–09). In 2012, John Fugelsang hosted a series of videos on the YouTube channel "POLIPOP". From January 2013 until August 2013, Fugelsang was the host of the Current TV political talk show Viewpoint. The show ended with the end of all live programming on Current.

Political commentator
In addition to his appearances on the late-night political talk show Politically Incorrect (1993–2002), Fugelsang has been a contributor to HuffPost weblog.

He is a regular commentator and guest on nationally syndicated progressive radio program The Stephanie Miller Show, and has served as guest host on occasion. His usual guest spot on the show is called "Fridays with Fugelsang." He also tours alongside Miller and comedian/musician Hal Sparks as part of the Sexy Liberal Comedy Show. For 2017, the tour is now called "Sexy Liberal Resistance Tour" along with Frangela (Frances Callier and Angela Shelton). The first show for the new tour was at the Barrymore, April 22, 2017, Madison, WI.

He's been featured on CNN, Fox News, Dennis Miller, The Young Turks, Air America, CNBC, and MSNBC. He served as the host on the Current TV political talk show, So That Happened. Additionally, he has contributed to Current TV's coverage of the 2012 presidential campaign. In an appearance on CNN in 2012, a question of his prompted the Romney campaign's Etch-a-sketch gaffe. On January 6, 2013, he replaced Eliot Spitzer as host of Viewpoint on Current TV; however, Current TV was bought by Al Jazeera America later in 2013.  Since January 12, 2015, Fugelsang has been hosting Tell Me Everything, a talk show on Sirius XM Insight.

Personal life
He lives with his wife, designer Charmien La Framenta, and their son, Henry Jack, in Hollywood and New York City's Greenwich Village. Fugelsang debated atheist Jamie Kilstein, noting his views as being founded upon what Jesus preached.

Filmography

References

External links

Videos on YouTube
Biography at William Morris Agency

1969 births
Living people
American bloggers
American male film actors
American male television actors
American male writers
American male stage actors
American male bloggers
American people of Danish descent
American people of German descent
American people of Irish descent
American stand-up comedians
Current TV people
Tisch School of the Arts alumni
Participants in American reality television series
Ward Melville High School alumni

21st-century American comedians